Aaron Hardy (born 26 May 1986) is an English professional football defender who plays for Tadcaster.

Career
Hardy started his career with Huddersfield Town and made his debut for them on 17 October 2006, in their 2–1 home defeat against Doncaster Rovers in Round One of the Football League Trophy. He got many plaudits for his play at right-back in an otherwise poor team performance. Then, on 21 October, he played his first league match in Town's 2–1 win at Port Vale.

In the televised encounter on 5 January 2007 at Yeovil Town, substitute Hardy scored an own goal in Yeovil's 3–1 win when he turned Lee Morris's cross past Matt Glennon.

On 9 May, he was offered a six-month contract by new Huddersfield Town boss Andy Ritchie, which he accepted on 31 May. On 28 September, after a series of good performances at right-back as cover for the injured Frank Sinclair, his contract was extended to the end of the season.

Hardy was released by Huddersfield Town 6 May 2008. In July 2008, he signed for Harrogate Town where he made 12 appearances before following manager Neil Aspin to FC Halifax Town in July 2009.

In June 2012 he joined Bradford Park Avenue, although his spell at The Horsfall was short lived as in August, he joined Farsley.

Becoming the ninth signing of the management duo Michael Morton and Simon Collins, Hardy joined Tadcaster Albion in Northern Premier League Division One North.

References

External links 

Living people
1986 births
People from South Elmsall
English footballers
Association football defenders
Huddersfield Town A.F.C. players
Harrogate Town A.F.C. players
FC Halifax Town players
Bradford (Park Avenue) A.F.C. players
Guiseley A.F.C. players
Farsley Celtic F.C. players
English Football League players
Footballers from West Yorkshire